Tumanovo is the name of several rural localities in Russia:
Tumanovo, Altai Krai, a selo in Tumanovsky Selsoviet of Soloneshensky District of Altai Krai
Tumanovo, Sakhalin Oblast, a selo in Makarovsky District of Sakhalin Oblast
Tumanovo, Smolensk Oblast, a selo in Tumanovskoye Rural Settlement of Vyazemsky District of Smolensk Oblast
Tumanovo, Sverdlovsk Oblast, a village in Turinsky District of Sverdlovsk Oblast